Amritsar Govindsingh Ram Singh (14 July 1910 – 11 August 1999) was an Indian first-class cricketer. An allrounder, he bowled slow left-arm orthodox and was a left-handed middle order batsman. His son A. G. Kripal Singh played Test cricket for India.

Ram Singh played for Madras and was just the second player to achieve the Ranji Trophy double of 1000 runs and 100 wickets. He was the first bowler to take 5 wickets in an innings and 10 wickets in a match in the Ranji Trophy. He achieved that feat in the very first match of the Ranji Trophy, playing for Madras against Mysore. He took his best ever innings figures of 8 for 14 in a Madras Presidency Match, playing for the Indians against the Europeans.

He was a much loved cricket coach for the schoolboys of Sir M Venkatasubba Rao Boys School in T Nagar, Madras during the late 1970s and the 1980s. His dedication to the game and to the young cricketers was something which those he coached have kept very close to their cricketing hearts.

References

External links

1910 births
1999 deaths
Indian cricketers
Tamil Nadu cricketers
South Zone cricketers
Cricketers from Chennai